Ascon is a family of lightweight authenticated ciphers that had been selected by US National Institute of Standards and Technology (NIST) for future standardization of the lightweight cryptography.

History 
Ascon was developed in 2014 by a team of researchers from Graz University of Technology, Infineon Technologies, Lamarr Security Research, and Radboud University. The cipher family was chosen as a finalist of the CAESAR Competition in February 2019.

NIST had announced its decision on February 7, 2023 with the following intermediate steps that would lead to the eventual standardization:
 Publication of  NIST IR 8454 describing the process of evaluation and selection that was used;
 Preparation of a new draft for public comments;
 Public workshop to be held on June 21-22, 2023.

Design 
The design is based on a sponge construction along the lines of SpongeWrap and MonkeyDuplex. This design makes it easy to reuse Ascon in multiple ways (as a cipher, hash, or a MAC). As of February 2023, the Ascon suite contained seven ciphers, including:
 Ascon-128 and Ascon-128a authenticated ciphers;
 Ascon-Hash cryptographic hash;
 Ascon-Xof extendable-output function;
 Ascon-80pq cipher with an "increased" 160-bit key.

The main components have been borrowed from other designs:
 substitution layer utilizes a modified S-box from the  function of Keccak;

Parameterization 
The ciphers are parameterizable by the key length k (up to 128 bits), "rate" (block size) r, and two numbers of rounds a, b. All algorithms support authenticated encryption with plaintext P and additional authenticated data A (that remains unencrypted). The encryption input also includes a public nonce N, the output - authentication tag T, size of the ciphertext C is the same as that of P. The decryption uses N, A, C, and T as inputs and produces either P or signals verification failure if the massage has been altered. Nonce and tag have the same size as the key K (k bits).

In the CAESAR submission, two sets of parameters were recommended:

Padding 
The data in both A and P is padded with a single bit with the value of 1 and a number of zeros to the nearest multiple of  bits. As an exception, if A is an empty string, there is no padding at all.

State 
The state consists of 320 bits, so the capacity . The state is initialized by an initialization vector IV (constant for each cipher type, e.g., hex 
80400c0600000000 for Ascon-128) concatenated with K and N.

Transformation 
The initial state is transformed by applying the transformation function   times. The ciphertext C is contained in the first  bits of the result of the XOR. Decryption is near-identical to encryption.

Transformation  consists of three layers:
 , XORing the round constants;
 , application of 5-bit S-boxes;
 , application of linear diffusion.

References

Sources

External links 
 

Authenticated-encryption schemes
Extendable-output functions
Cryptographic hash functions